Stereotypes of Hispanic and Latino Americans in the United States are general representations of Americans considered of Hispanic and Latino ancestry or  immigrants to the United States from Spain or Latin America, often exhibited in negative caricatures or terms. Latin America is generally considered to comprise all of the politically independent territory of the Western Hemisphere other than Canada and the United States that was originally colonized by the Spaniards or Portuguese. "Latino" is the umbrella term for people of Latin American descent that in recent years has supplanted the more imprecise and bureaucratic designation "Hispanic." Part of the mystery and the difficulty of comprehension lie in the fact that the territory called Latin America is not homogeneous in nature or culture. Latin American stereotypes have the greatest impact on public perceptions, and Latin Americans were the most negatively rated on several characteristics. Americans' perceptions of the characteristics of Latin American immigrants are often linked to their beliefs about the impact of immigration on unemployment, schools, and crime.

Portrayal in film and television

Lack of representation 
When discussing how Hispanic and Latino individuals are represented in television and film media, it is also important to acknowledge their vast underrepresentation in popular programming. The individuals are often stereotyped on television, but they are rarely even seen. Latino Americans represent approximately 18% of the US population but only 0.6 to 6.5% of all primetime program characters, 1% of television families, and fewer than 4.5% of commercial actors. That poses the issue that Hispanic and Latino characters are not rarely seen, but even when they are, they are more than likely to be stereotyped. In the unlikely case that they are depicted, they are more likely to be limited to stereotypic characters, usually negatively. In September 2021, Bryan Dimas, co-founder of Latinx in Animation, mentioned an animated series with about 52 episodes which never "had a person of color that was a writer...other than one of the executive producers and some of the production crew," but said that shows are moving away from "having white writers writing for Black characters or Asian characters or Latino characters," and said that he believed there was a wave of more diverse representation in the future.

Stereotypical representation 
Stereotypical representation of Hispanic and Latino characters are typically negatively presented and attack the entire ethnic group's morality, work ethic, intelligence, or dignity. Even in non-fiction media, such as news outlets, Hispanics are usually reported on in crime, immigration, or drug-related stories than in accomplishments. The stereotypes can also differ between men and women. Hispanic and Latino men are more likely to be stereotyped as unintelligent, comedic, aggressive, sexual, and unprofessional, earning them titles as "Latin lovers," buffoons, or criminals. That often results in the individuals being characterized as working less-respectable careers, being involved in crimes (often drug-related), or being uneducated immigrants. Hispanic characters are more likely than non-Hispanic white characters to possess lower-status occupations, such as domestic workers, or be involved in drug-related crimes. Hispanic and Latina women, similarly, are typically portrayed as lazy, verbally aggressive, and lacking work ethic. Latinas in modern movies follow old stereotypes. Latinas are still deemed as "less than", objectified and known for being to be alluring to others.

Resulting perspectives 
According to Qingwen, "the impact of television portrayals of minorities is significant because of the ability of television images to activate racial stereotypes and the power exerted by visual images." Non-Hispanic white Americans who lack real-life contact with Hispanic or Latino individuals are forced to rely heavily on television and film, their only source of exposure to the ethnic group, as the foundation of perceiving Hispanic and Latino individuals. If nearly all of the few representations of the individuals are negatively stereotyped, non-Hispanic and Latino white individuals are likely to carry the perception into real life, embedding that stereotypical image of Hispanic and Latino individuals into their consciousness. Bandura's Social Cognitive Theory gives insight into how the stereotypical character representations are carried into the real world and points to the way in which individuals' perceptions are limited to what they have experienced. Those who lack real-life contact with the stereotyped individuals are unable to counter the television portrayals of this ethnic group with a more realistic and less negative image.

Stereotypes in news media 
Between 2001 and 2010, the Hispanic population increased significantly in the United States, marking Hispanics as the largest minority in California. The news media began negatively framing Hispanics as criminals, illegal immigrants, dangerous and violent, further perpetuating prejudice, discrimination, and stereotypes of Hispanics. According to Loyola Marymount University researchers Santiago Arias and Lea Hellmueller:
"Research shows that on English-language news media networks, during the 1990s, negative attitudes started to arise against Hispanics-and-Latinos. This began after voters approved California Proposition 187 in 1994."

Proposition 187 was a 1994 ballot initiative to establish a California-run citizenship screening system and prohibit illegal aliens from using non-emergency health care, public education, and other services in the state. Arias and Hellmueller stated that the proposition spurred a slate of negative images and claims associated with Hispanics and Latinos in the United States, and affected the Hispanic community greatly by limiting employment opportunities, increasing maltreatment in the criminal justice system, and perpetuating victimization through violent hate crimes against Latinos. Studies show that from 2003 to 2007, violent hate crimes against Latinos rose by 40%.

Instead of focusing on positive attributes related to Hispanics and Latinos, Arias and Hellmueller wrote that news media content focused mainly on stereotypes and misjudgments when they addressed the population. As a result, news media programs helped build a "semantic meaning of the Hispanic-and-Latino identity as a metonym for illegal immigration." 
"This discourse consists of promoting the idea that crime and undocumented immigrants, and the costs of illegal immigration in social services and taxes directly result from the increase of Hispanics-and-Latinos in the United States."

According to Arias and Hellmueller, the news media portrayed Hispanics as the enemy, consistently labeling them as illegal immigrants and violent criminals without statistics or facts to support their claims. A 2002 study conducted by Chiricos and Escholz examined race and news media content and investigated how news media content primes the local public's fear of crime.
"The findings suggested fear of crime forms part of a new 'modern racism'; that is, that local television news may contribute to the social construction of threat in relation to both minorities; television over-represents African Americans and Hispanics in crime news in relation to their share of the general population."

Another study conducted by Waldman and colleagues analyzed three cable commentators: Lou Dobbs, Bill O'Reilly, and Glenn Beck and their discussion of illegal immigration. These results concluded that 70% of the Lou Dobbs Tonight episodes in 2007 contained discussion of illegal immigration, 56% of the O'Reilly Factor episodes in 2007 discussed illegal immigration and Glenn Beck discussed illegal immigration in 28% of his year 2007 programs. As a result of popular shows labeling Hispanics as "illegal immigrants" and often portraying Hispanics in a negative light, the programs gave anti-immigration activists a platform for discrimination.

In attempt to verify the accuracy of stereotypes held against Latinos, studies conducted at Harvard and Michigan showed that undocumented and foreign-born immigrants were far less likely to commit acts of deviance, crime, drunk driving, or any kind of action that may jeopardize US citizens' well-being. In addition, the study found that the incarceration rate of foreign-born citizens is five times less the rate of native-born citizens.

Hispanics and crime 
According to several scholars, the stereotypes of Hispanics are similar to the ones associated with African-Americans. Often characterized as being dangerous, drug traffickers, drug users, violent, and gang bangers, Hispanics are subjected to much stereotyping in the United States in relation to crime, especially by their white counterparts. However, contrary to popular belief, Hispanic immigrants commit crime at lower rates than the general population.

Stereotypes of Hispanic and Latino men

Cholo 
A very common stereotype of Hispanic/Latino males is that of the criminal, gang member, or "cholo". It is connected to the idea of Hispanic/Latinos being lower class and living in dangerous neighborhoods that breed the attitude of "cholo". Cholo and chola are terms often used in the United States to denote members of the Chicano gang subculture. The individuals are characterized by a defiant street attitude, a distinctive dress style, and the use of caló, slang, speech. In the United States, the term "cholo" often has a negative connotation and so tends to be imposed upon a group of people, rather than being used as a means of self-identification. That leads to considerable ambiguity in the particulars of its definition. In its most basic usage, it always refers to a degree of indigeneity.

"Illegal alien"/ "job stealer" 
Hispanic/Latinos are frequently seen as the "others" in the United States despite their large percentage of the population. The otherness becomes a lens in which to view them as foreign or not being American. That mentality creates the illegal stereotype and the concept of job stealing. Generally, the term "immigrant" has positive connotations in relation to the development and operation of democracy and US history, but "illegal aliens" are vilified. The term "illegal alien" is defined as "a foreign person who is living in a country without having official permission to live there." Although many Latino/Hispanic Americans were born in the United States or have legal status, they can be dismissed as immigrants or foreigners who live without proper documentation taking opportunities and resources from real Americans. Immigrants have been represented as depriving citizens of jobs, as welfare-seekers, or as criminals. Especially with the recent political/social movement in the United States for stricter immigration law, Americans are blaming Hispanics for "stealing jobs" and negatively impacting the economy.

Homogenous origin 
A very common stereotype, as well as mentality, is that all Hispanic/Latino individuals have the same ethnic background, race, and culture but there are really numerous subgroups, with unique identities. Americans tend to explain all of Latin America in terms of the nationalities or countries that they know. For instance, in the Midwest and the Southwest, Latin Americans are largely perceived as Mexicans, but in the East, particularly in the New York and Boston areas, people consider Latin Americans through their limited interactions with Dominicans and Puerto Ricans. In Miami, Cubans and Central Americans are the reference group for interpreting Latin America. The idea of homogeneity is so extensive in US society that even important politicians tend to treat Latin America as a culturally-unified region.

Hard labor worker or uneducated/lazy  
There are two conflicting common stereotypes in accordance with employment that male Hispanic/Latinos tend to fall into a manual labor worker or an unemployed/lazy citizen. Many Hispanic/Latino Americans have equally as much education and skill level but are seen as "hard labor workers" such as farmhands, gardeners, and cleaners. This stereotype goes along with that of the immigrant in believing all Hispanics/Latinos work in hard labor fields and manual labor only because they arrive in the country legally, which is false. Latin Americans are also often pictured as not strongly inclined to work hard, despite the conflicting stereotype of working manual labor jobs. Today, negative stereotypes against certain ethnic groups about low cognitive abilities exist in many world regions, including stereotypes about people with a Latino background in the United States.

Discrepancy between Hispanic identity and identity 
Latino masculinity, which is already coded as violent, criminal, and dangerous (Collins 1991; Ferguson 2000; Vasquez 2010), makes the racial project of controlling images systematically restrict Latinos' lives. Machismo is depicted as the cult of male strength, which implies being fearless, self-confident, capable of making decisions, and able to support one's family. It also emphasized an acceptance of male dominance over women, including the valorization of Don Juanism, and, in its extreme form, a defense of the traditional division of labor (women in the kitchen and taking care of the children and men as providers). Hollywood movies, along with some American scholars and other people in the country, tend to regard machismo as unique to Latin America.

Stereotypes of Hispanic and Latina women

Entertainment and marketing industries 
According to a Framing Latinas: Hispanic women through the lenses of Spanish-language and English-language news media, a 2010 paper by Teresa Correa, Latinas have been historically depicted as possessing one of two completely-contrasting identities. They have been depicted as either "virginal," "passive," and "dependent on men" or as "hot-tempered," "tempestuous," "promiscuous," and "sexy." A 2005 study conducted by Dana Mastro and Elizabeth Behm-Morawitz, professors of communication studies at the University of Arizona, found depictions of Latina Americans on primetime television are both limited and biased. The study analyzed the frequency and the quality of the depictions of Hispanic individuals on primetime television in 2002. The study found that "Latinas were the laziest characters in primetime... they were the least intelligent, most verbally aggressive, embodied the lowest work ethic, and (alongside whites) were the most ridiculed."  According to the same studies, the marketing industry has also played a role in stereotyping females with Hispanic origin by using the stereotypical identities to sell product. Specifically, the bodies of Latina women have been used and sexualized to sell product targeted to men. According to Mary Gilly, a professor of business at the University of California Irvine, Latina women, in particular, are eroticized in the marketing industry because of their frequent portrayal as "tempestuous," "promiscuous," or "sexy."

Fiery Latina and the hot señorita 

Stereotypical identities that have spurred from the idea that Hispanic and Latina women are "hot-tempered", "tempestuous", "promiscuous" and "sexy" include the "fiery Latina" and the "hot señorita." Both stem from the fact that Hispanic and Latina women are continually sexualized and eroticized in popular programming and in the entertainment industry as a whole. Examples include Sofia Vergara's character on Modern Family, but examples date back to the 1920s and 1930s with "Dolores del Río playing the exotic and passionate lover of the 1920s, and Carmen Miranda playing sexy and bombshell characters in the 1930s and 1940s." Vergara portrays Gloria Delgado-Pritchett on Modern Family, a "trophy wife" often seen in provocative clothing and high heeled shoes. She often has trouble pronouncing English words and speaks with a heavy accent. Among the contemporary depictions accused of promoting the "Latina bombshell" include Iris Chacón's image, Naya Rivera in Glee, and Shakira and Jennifer Lopez's music videos.

Fertility threat 
One reason for Latinas being stereotyped as hyper-sexualization is the idealistic picture of large Latino families with multiple children because of Latinas wrongly thought of as being highly sexual in nature. That has created the political and social threat of Latina's "hyper-fertility" in which there is a concern that the hypothetical fertility and birthing rates of Latinas is much more than their non-Hispanic white people, adding to the threat of the Latino presence in the United States (Gutiérrez 2008; Chavez 2004).

A study compared the sexual activity of non-Hispanic white women and Latinas in Orange County, California, where there is a high population of Mexican American families. Non-Hispanic white women began sexual relations about a year younger than all of the Latinas in the survey reported. The non-Hispanic white women were more likely to report having had five or more sexual partners, but Latinas were more likely to report no more than two. Both non-Hispanic white women and Latinas showed a trend towards fewer children per household. In fact, second-generation Latinas were shown to have fewer children than non-Hispanic white women.

News and media 
According to several sources, the entertainment industry can be credited with the creation and frequent reinforcement of the stereotypes, but the news is particularly important in the maintenance of these stereotypes. Unlike the entertainment and marketing industries, according to several studies, the press produces representations that are based on "reality." A 1994 study by Macrea et al., found stereotypes are generalizations that our culture has defined for us, and that using stereotypes is "more efficient." Thus, according to Macrea et al., journalists, because of time and space constraints, may be more likely to rely on stereotypic portrayals.

Correa found that both Hispanic Americans have been underrepresented in news media and that their limited portrayal have been depicted as a burden on contemporary American society. The 2016 election of President Donald Trump brought the issue to the forefront of American news, and issues relating specifically to immigration perpetuated stereotypes of Hispanic and Latino Americans as criminals.

Inaccuracies

Lazy stereotype 
Ethnic-minority students, who are in the lower-income bracket, are more likely to attend schools that are overcrowded, dangerous, and limited in the opportunities offered for advanced coursework with experienced teachers. Because of the inequalities in education, the graduation rate for Latino students is substantially below the rate for white students. 

Contrary to the belief that Hispanics are "lazy," a study by Andrew J. Fuligni has shown that "students from ethnic minority backgrounds often have higher levels of motivation than their equally achieving peers from European backgrounds.... Latin American and Asian families have significantly higher values of academic success and a stronger belief in the utility of education." The high level of motivation comes from Hispanics having a greater sense of obligation to support, assist, and respect the family.

A common misconception about Latinos and language learning is that not being able to speak English is a sign of unwillingness to learn. Some immigrants, from Mexico and other Latin countries, live in the United States for decades without acquiring a basic command of English. The primary reason is that it is difficult to learn a second language as an adult. Another reason is that finding time to learn a new language while struggling to financially support and spend time with family may be impossible.

Job-stealing stereotype 
The "job-stealing Hispanic" stereotype is also false. According to Pastora San Juan Cafferty and William C. McCready, "a preliminary study of labor market competition among the black, Hispanic, and non-Hispanic white population (Borjas, 1983) found no evidence that Hispanics had a negative impact on the earnings of the other two groups." Hispanics are not "taking away" jobs that non-Hispanic groups want. The blue-collar jobs Hispanics obtain are low paying and have few fringe benefits, leading to little or no health insurance coverage.

Criminal stereotype 
The aggressive "Hispanic gang member /criminal" stereotype, which is often see in movies and on television, is inaccurate. Gang-suppression approaches of numerous police departments have become "over-inclusive and embedded with practices that create opportunities for abuse of authority." This means most of the gang enforcement police stops are based on racial profiling. These stops involve no reasonable suspicion of criminal activity and oftentimes include non-gang members.

Impacts

Trouble establishing identities 
Hispanic youth have a more difficult time establishing a positive school identity because of the negative academic stereotypes regarding their racial-ethnic group. The academic stereotypes, which negatively affect the academic performance of Latinos, focus on inability, laziness, and a lack of interest and curiosity.

Adolescence makes teenagers come face to face with deeply-rooted social issues, and the challenges they face can be daunting. For young Latinas in particular, the societal and emotional issues that they must come to terms with can be complicated. These issues can be complicated because they are learning who they are and what they want their role to be in society, but they also must fight against the stereotypes that have been imposed upon them by culture. Positive identity formation for young Latinas may be more difficult to achieve than it is for young Anglo girls. Some have postulated that providing young Latinas with the concepts of feminism may enhance their abilities to believe in themselves and improve their chances of realizing that they have the abilities to be successful because of who they are, not because of who they married. However, a recent study published in the Journal of Adolescent Research found that young Latinas may have a "different perspective" on feminism than their Anglo counterparts. The study found that Latinas experienced feminism differently because of cultural values; young Latinas "face an intricate balance between future family and career goals in their identity development." Some Latinas interviewed in the study expressed concern that if they told a young man that they were feminists, "they might assume that the girls didn't like men" and a large number also opposed the ideas of feminism and equality because of traditional values. The study ultimately determined that the majority of the young Latinas interviewed considered themselves to be feminists but a relatively large minority of the young women rejected the idea of feminism and equality because they were fearful of possible female superiority and endorsed traditional family values and female occupations.

Research shows that many Latinos in the United States do not identify as "American" but instead with their or their parents' or grandparents' country of origin. One of the reasons is the misbelief that to be an American, one needs to be white. Latinos who have experienced racial discrimination are more likely to identify as Latino or Latino American than simply American because they feel they are not treated as "real" Americans.

Mental instability 
A study by Suárez-Orozco and Suárez-Orozco (2001) has shown that the internalization of perceived stigmatized identity of Hispanics can lead to resigned helplessness, self-defeating behavior, and depression.

Academic performance 
Findings from an experimental study of college-bound Hispanic students showed that when Hispanic students were faced with stereotype threat, their academic performance suffered. Results of the study showed that Latino students who internalized racial stereotypes performed worse on a standardized test than Hispanic students who did not internalize those same stereotypes. The negative impact of racial stereotypes on student performance has implications for the overall educational journey of Hispanic and Latino students. Performing poorly on standardized tests could lead to limitations in the options available for furthering education. Another experimental study of Latino undergraduate students found that Latino students in the stereotype threat condition performed worse on an exam than all other students with which they were compared (Latino students in non-stereotype threat condition and white students in both stereotype threat and non-stereotype threat conditions). A study by Fischer (2009) found that Hispanic college students who internalize negative stereotypes about themselves tend to spend fewer hours studying, which further decreases their academic performance.

See also

 Stereotypes of groups within the United States
 Hispanophobia
 Racial profiling
 Stereotype threat
 Colombia in popular culture
 Chicano, Tejano and Nuyorican
 Latino

References

Further reading
GalleryBlog on Latina/o Stereotypes. This blog serves as a constantly updated resource for Tex(t)-Mex, a University of Texas Press volume (2007)
"The Myth of the Latin Woman: I Just Met a Girl Named Maria" by Judith Ortiz Cofer

External links 

 Jim Cooper's Orange County; The Invisible Hispanic 1984-03-23, National Records and Archives Administration, American Archive of Public Broadcasting
 Voter's Pipeline; Hispanics: Refocus for Survival 1980-12-04, National Records and Archives Administration, American Archive of Public Broadcasting

Hispanic and Latino Americans
Hispanophobia
Stereotypes of Hispanic and Latino people